The 5.6×50mm Magnum (designated as the 5,6 × 50 Mag. by  the C.I.P.) is a centerfire, rimless, bottlenecked rifle cartridge that was developed in 1970 by Günter Frères of the Deutsche Waffen und Munitionsfabriken (DWM).

Parent case
In 1968 Günter Frères developed the parent case, the rimmed 5.6x50mmR Magnum (designated 5,6 x 50 R Mag. by the C.I.P. According to the official C.I.P ruling, the rimless 5.6x50mm Magnum can handle up to  Pmax piezo pressure, which is  more than the rimmed parent case developed four years prior.

Uses
In North America it is considered a varmint hunting cartridge.

Related cartridges
This cartridge occupies a useful performance niche approximately halfway between the .222 Remington and the 5.6×57mm, similar to the slightly less powerful .222 Remington Magnum and the .223 Remington.

See also
 List of rifle cartridges
 5 mm caliber

References

 5.6×50 Magnum by Chuck Hawks
 5.6×50 Magnum Cartridge dimensions at Steve's Pages
 Vihtavuori Metric Reloading Guide for Centerfire Cartridges, 2002, page 14

External links
 5,6×50 Mag. at Deutsches-Jagd-Lexikon.de 
 5,6×50 R Mag. at Deutsches-Jagd-Lexikon.de 
 Wiederladetipps by Klaus Dockendorf 

Pistol and rifle cartridges